The Worst Witch is a fantasy drama children's television series about a group of young witches at a Magic Academy. The series is based on the novel series of the same name by Jill Murphy, rebooting the 1998 television series and it's spin-offs. The international co-production between CBBC, ZDF and Netflix premiered in 2017, and it has been released over the course of four series.

Series overview

Episodes

Series 1 (2017)

Series 2 (2018)

Series 3 (2019)

Series 4 (2020)

References

External links
 

List
Lists of children's television series episodes
Lists of fantasy television series episodes
Television episodes about witchcraft